Thomas or Tom Owen may refer to:

Politicians
Thomas ab Owen (by 1511–1575 or later), Welsh politician
Thomas Owen (died 1598), English judge and politician, MP for Shrewsbury
Thomas Owen (died 1661), English politician, MP for Shrewsbury
Thomas Owen (died 1708), MP for Haverfordwest
Thomas Jefferson Vance Owen (1801–1835), American politician
Thomas Owen (Launceston MP) (1840–1898), British politician, MP for Launceston, Cornwall
Tom Owen (politician) (active since 1968), American historian and politician in Louisville, Kentucky

Others
Thomas Owen (priest) (1749–1812), Welsh Anglican priest and translator of works on agriculture
Thomas Owen (boxer) (1768–1843), English boxwe
Thomas Ellis Owen (1805–1862), English architect and developer
Thomas Owen (footballer) (1861–?), Welsh footballer
Thomas H. Owen, judge of the Oklahoma Supreme Court
Thomas M. Owen (1866–1920), American archivist and historian
Thomas Owen (author) (1910–2002), Belgian author of weird and supernatural fiction
Thomas Richard Owen (1918–1990), Welsh geologist
Tom Owen (actor) (1949–2022), British actor
Tom Owen (American football) (born 1952), former American football quarterback who played in ten NFL seasons from 1974–1982
Tom Owen-Evans (born 1997), English footballer
Tom Owen (speedway rider) (born 1951), English speedway rider
Thomas A. Owen (Australian) (born 2008), Australian